Iron fertilization is the intentional introduction of iron to iron-poor areas of the ocean surface to stimulate phytoplankton production. This is intended to enhance biological productivity and/or accelerate carbon dioxide sequestration from the atmosphere. Iron is a trace element necessary for photosynthesis in plants. It is highly insoluble in sea water and in a variety of locations is the limiting nutrient for phytoplankton growth. Large algal blooms can be created by supplying iron to iron-deficient ocean waters. These blooms can nourish other organisms.

Ocean iron fertilization is an example of a geoengineering technique. Iron fertilization attempts to encourage phytoplankton growth, which removes carbon from the atmosphere for at least a period of time. This technique is controversial because there is limited understanding of its complete effects on the marine ecosystem, including side effects and possibly large deviations from expected behavior. Such effects potentially include release of nitrogen oxides, and disruption of the ocean's nutrient balance. Controversy remains over the effectiveness of atmospheric  sequestration and ecological effects. Since 1990, 13 major large scale experiments have been carried out to evaluate efficiency and possible consequences of the iron fertilization in ocean waters. A study in 2017 determined that the method is unproven; sequestering efficiency is low and sometimes no effect was seen and the amount of iron deposits that is needed to make a small cut in the carbon emissions is in the million tons per year.

Approximately 25 per cent of the ocean surface has ample macronutrients, with little plant biomass (as defined by chlorophyll). The production in these high-nutrient low-chlorophyll (HNLC) waters is primarily limited by micronutrients especially iron. The cost of distributing iron over large ocean areas is large compared with the expected value of carbon credits. Research in the early 2020s suggested that it could only permanently sequester a small amount of carbon.

Process

Role of iron in carbon sequestration 
Ocean iron fertilization is an example of a geoengineering technique that involves intentional introduction of iron-rich deposits into oceans, and is aimed to enhance biological productivity of organisms in ocean waters in order to increase carbon dioxide uptake from the atmosphere, possibly resulting in mitigating its global warming effects. Iron is a trace element in the ocean and its presence is vital for photosynthesis in plants, and in particular phytoplanktons, as it has been shown that iron deficiency can limit ocean productivity and phytoplankton growth. For this reason, the "iron hypothesis" was put forward by Martin in late 1980s where he suggested that changes in iron supply in iron-deficient seawater can bloom plankton growth and have a significant effect on the concentration of atmospheric carbon dioxide by altering rates of carbon sequestration. In fact, fertilization is an important process that occurs naturally in the ocean waters. For instance, upwellings of ocean currents can bring nutrient-rich sediments to the surface. Another example is through transfer of iron-rich minerals, dust, and volcanic ash over long distances by rivers, glaciers, or wind. Moreover, it has been suggested that whales can transfer iron-rich ocean dust to the surface, where planktons can take it up to grow. It has been shown that reduction in the number of sperm whales in the Southern Ocean has resulted in a 200,000 tonnes/yr decrease in the atmospheric carbon uptake, possibly due to limited phytoplankton growth.

Carbon sequestration by phytoplankton 

Phytoplankton is photosynthetic: it needs sunlight and nutrients to grow, and takes up carbon dioxide in the process. Plankton can take up and sequester atmospheric carbon through generating calcium or silicon-carbonate skeletons. When these organisms die they sink to the ocean floor where their carbonate skeletons can form a major component of the carbon-rich deep sea precipitation, thousands of meters below plankton blooms, known as marine snow. Nonetheless, based on the definition, carbon is only considered "sequestered" when it is deposited in the ocean floor where it can be retained for millions of years. However, most of the carbon-rich biomass generated from plankton is generally consumed by other organisms (small fish, zooplankton, etc.) and substantial part of rest of the deposits that sink beneath plankton blooms may be re-dissolved in the water and gets transferred to the surface where it eventually returns to the atmosphere, thus, nullifying any possible intended effects regarding carbon sequestration. Nevertheless, supporters of the idea of iron fertilization believe that carbon sequestration should be re-defined over much shorter time frames and claim that since the carbon is suspended in the deep ocean it is effectively isolated from the atmosphere for hundreds of years, and thus, carbon can be effectively sequestered.

Efficiency and concerns 
Assuming the ideal conditions, the upper estimates for possible effects of iron fertilization in slowing down global warming is about 0.3W/m2 of averaged negative forcing which can offset roughly 15–20% of the current anthropogenic  emissions. Research on this area has suggested that fertilization through deposition of large quantities of iron-rich dust into the ocean floor can significantly disrupt the ocean's nutrient balance and cause major complications in the food chain for other marine organisms.

Methods
There are two ways of performing artificial iron fertilization: ship based direct into the ocean and atmospheric deployment.

Ship based deployment
Trials of ocean fertilization using iron sulphate added directly to the surface water from ships are described in detail in the experiment section below.

Atmospheric sourcing
Iron-rich dust rising into the atmosphere is a primary source of ocean iron fertilization. For example, wind blown dust from the Sahara desert fertilizes the Atlantic Ocean and the Amazon rainforest. The naturally occurring iron oxide in atmospheric dust reacts with hydrogen chloride from sea spray to produce iron chloride, which degrades methane and other greenhouse gases, brightens clouds and eventually falls with the rain in low concentration across a wide area of the globe. Unlike ship based deployment, no trials have been performed of increasing the natural level of atmospheric iron. Expanding this atmospheric source of iron could complement ship-based deployment.

One proposal is to boost the atmospheric iron level with iron salt aerosol. Iron(III) chloride added to the troposphere could increase natural cooling effects including methane removal, cloud brightening and ocean fertilization, helping to prevent or reverse global warming.

Experiments
Martin hypothesized that increasing phytoplankton photosynthesis could slow or even reverse global warming by sequestering  in the sea. He died shortly thereafter during preparations for Ironex I, a proof of concept research voyage, which was successfully carried out near the Galapagos Islands in 1993 by his colleagues at Moss Landing Marine Laboratories. Thereafter 12 international ocean studies examined the phenomenon:

 Ironex II, 1995
 SOIREE (Southern Ocean Iron Release Experiment), 1999
 EisenEx (Iron Experiment), 2000
 SEEDS (Subarctic Pacific Iron Experiment for Ecosystem Dynamics Study), 2001
 SOFeX (Southern Ocean Iron Experiments - North & South), 2002
 SERIES (Subarctic Ecosystem Response to Iron Enrichment Study), 2002
 SEEDS-II, 2004
 EIFEX (European Iron Fertilization Experiment), A successful experiment conducted in 2004 in a mesoscale ocean eddy in the South Atlantic resulted in a bloom of diatoms, a large portion of which died and sank to the ocean floor when fertilization ended. In contrast to the LOHAFEX experiment, also conducted in a mesoscale eddy, the ocean in the selected area contained enough dissolved silicon for the diatoms to flourish.
 CROZEX (CROZet natural iron bloom and Export experiment), 2005
 A pilot project planned by Planktos, a U.S. company, was cancelled in 2008 for lack of funding. The company blamed environmental organizations for the failure.
 LOHAFEX (Indian and German Iron Fertilization Experiment), 2009  Despite widespread opposition to LOHAFEX, on 26 January 2009 the German Federal Ministry of Education and Research (BMBF) gave clearance. The experiment was carried out in waters low in silicic acid, an essential nutrient for diatom growth. This affected sequestration efficacy. A  portion of the southwest Atlantic was fertilized with iron sulfate. A large phytoplankton bloom was triggered.   In the absence of diatoms, a relatively small amount of carbon was sequestered, because other phytoplankton are vulnerable to predation by zooplankton and do not sink rapidly upon death. These poor sequestration results led to suggestions that fertilization is not an effective carbon mitigation strategy in general. However, prior ocean fertilization experiments in high silica locations revealed much higher carbon sequestration rates because of diatom growth. LOHAFEX confirmed sequestration potential depends strongly upon appropriate siting.
Critics alleged George's actions violated the United Nations Convention on Biological Diversity (CBD) and the London convention on the dumping of wastes at sea which prohibited such geoengineering experiments. On 15 July 2014, the resulting scientific data was made available to the public.
John Martin, director of the Moss Landing Marine Laboratories, hypothesized that the low levels of phytoplankton in these regions are due to a lack of iron. In 1989 he tested this hypothesis (known as the Iron Hypothesis) by an experiment using samples of clean water from Antarctica. Iron was added to some of these samples. After several days the phytoplankton in the samples with iron fertilization grew much more than in the untreated samples. This led Martin to speculate that increased iron concentrations in the oceans could partly explain past ice ages.

IRONEX I 
This experiment was followed by a larger field experiment (IRONEX I) where 445 kg of iron was added to a patch of ocean near the Galápagos Islands. The levels of phytoplankton increased three times in the experimental area. The success of this experiment and others led to proposals to use this technique to remove carbon dioxide from the atmosphere.

EisenEx 
In 2000 and 2004, iron sulfate was discharged from the EisenEx. 10 to 20 percent of the resulting algal bloom died and sank to the sea floor.

Commercial projects 
Planktos was a US company that abandoned its plans to conduct 6 iron fertilization cruises from 2007 to 2009, each of which would have dissolved up to 100 tons of iron over a 10,000 km2 area of ocean. Their ship Weatherbird II was refused entry to the port of Las Palmas in the Canary Islands where it was to take on provisions and scientific equipment.

In 2007 commercial companies such as Climos and GreenSea Ventures and the Australian-based Ocean Nourishment Corporation, planned to engage in fertilization projects. These companies invited green co-sponsors to finance their activities in return for provision of carbon credits to offset investors' CO2 emissions.

LOHAFEX 
LOHAFEX was an experiment initiated by the German Federal Ministry of Research and carried out by the German Alfred Wegener Institute (AWI) in 2009 to study fertilization in the South Atlantic. India was also involved.

As part of the experiment, the German research vessel Polarstern deposited 6 tons of ferrous sulfate in an area of 300 square kilometers. It was expected that the material would distribute through the upper  of water and trigger an algal bloom. A significant part of the carbon dioxide dissolved in sea water would then be bound by the emerging bloom and sink to the ocean floor.

The Federal Environment Ministry called for the experiment to halt, partly because environmentalists predicted damage to marine plants. Others predicted long-term effects that would not be detectable during short-term observation or that this would encourage large-scale ecosystem manipulation.

2012 
A 2012 study deposited iron fertilizer in an eddy near Antarctica. The resulting algal bloom sent a significant amount of carbon into the deep ocean, where it was expected to remain for centuries to millennia. The eddy was chosen because it offered a largely self-contained test system.

As of day 24, nutrients, including nitrogen, phosphorus and silicic acid that diatoms use to construct their shells, declined. Dissolved inorganic carbon concentrations were reduced below equilibrium with atmospheric . In surface water, particulate organic matter (algal remains) including silica and chlorophyll increased.

Each iron atom converted at least 13,000 carbon atoms into algae. At least half of the organic matter sank below, .

Haida Gwaii project 
In July 2012, the Haida Salmon Restoration Corporation dispersed  of iron sulphate dust into the Pacific Ocean several hundred miles west of the islands of Haida Gwaii. The Old Massett Village Council financed the action as a salmon enhancement project with $2.5 million in village funds. The concept was that the formerly iron-deficient waters would produce more phytoplankton that would in turn serve as a "pasture" to feed salmon. Then-CEO Russ George hoped to sell carbon offsets to recover the costs. The project was accompanied by charges of unscientific procedures and recklessness. George contended that 100 tons was negligible compared to what naturally enters the ocean.

Some environmentalists called the dumping a "blatant violation" of two international moratoria. George said that the Old Massett Village Council and its lawyers approved the effort and at least seven Canadian agencies were aware of it.

According to George, the 2013 salmon runs increased from 50 million to 226 million fish. However, many experts contend that changes in fishery stocks since 2012 cannot necessarily be attributed to the 2012 iron fertilization; many factors contribute to predictive models, and most data from the experiment are considered to be of questionable scientific value.

On 15 July 2014, the data gathered during the project were made publicly available under the ODbL license.

Experiments with iron-coated rice husks in Arabian Sea 

In 2022, a UK/India research team plans to place iron-coated rice husks in the Arabian Sea, to test whether increasing time at the surface can stimulate a bloom using less iron. The iron will be confined within a plastic bag reaching from the surface several kilometers down to the sea bottom. The Centre for Climate Repair at the University of Cambridge, along with India's Institute of Maritime Studies assessed the impact of iron seeding in another experiment. They spread iron-coated rice husks across an area of the Arabian Sea. Iron is a limiting nutrient in many ocean waters. They hoped that the iron would fertilize algae, which would bolster the bottom of the marine food chain and sequester carbon as uneaten algae died. The experiment was demolished by a storm, leaving inconclusive results.

Science
The maximum possible result from iron fertilization, assuming the most favourable conditions and disregarding practical considerations, is 0.29 W/m2 of globally averaged negative forcing, offsetting 1/6 of current levels of anthropogenic  emissions.  These benefits have been called into question by research suggesting that fertilization with iron may deplete other essential nutrients in the seawater causing reduced phytoplankton growth elsewhere — in other words, that iron concentrations limit growth more locally than they do on a global scale.

Ocean fertilization occurs naturally when upwellings bring nutrient-rich water to the surface, as occurs when ocean currents meet an ocean bank or a sea mount. This form of fertilization produces the world's largest marine habitats. Fertilization can also occur when weather carries wind blown dust long distances over the ocean, or iron-rich minerals are carried into the ocean by glaciers, rivers and icebergs.

Role of iron
About 70% of the world's surface is covered in oceans. The part of these where light can penetrate is inhabited by algae (and other marine life). In some oceans, algae growth and reproduction is limited by the amount of iron. Iron is a vital micronutrient for phytoplankton growth and photosynthesis that has historically been delivered to the pelagic sea by dust storms from arid lands. This Aeolian dust contains 3–5% iron and its deposition has fallen nearly 25% in recent decades.

The Redfield ratio describes the relative atomic concentrations of critical nutrients in plankton biomass and is conventionally written "106 C: 16 N: 1 P." This expresses the fact that one atom of phosphorus and 16 of nitrogen are required to "fix" 106 carbon atoms (or 106 molecules of ). Research expanded this constant to "106 C: 16 N: 1 P: .001 Fe" signifying that in iron deficient conditions each atom of iron can fix 106,000 atoms of carbon, or on a mass basis, each kilogram of iron can fix 83,000 kg of carbon dioxide.  The 2004 EIFEX experiment reported a carbon dioxide to iron export ratio of nearly 3000 to 1.  The atomic ratio would be approximately: "3000 C: 58,000 N: 3,600 P: 1 Fe".

Therefore, small amounts of iron (measured by mass parts per trillion) in HNLC zones can trigger large phytoplankton blooms on the order of 100,000 kilograms of plankton per kilogram of iron. The size of the iron particles is critical. Particles of 0.5–1 micrometer or less seem to be ideal both in terms of sink rate and bioavailability. Particles this small are easier for cyanobacteria and other phytoplankton to incorporate and the churning of surface waters keeps them in the euphotic or sunlit biologically active depths without sinking for long periods.

Atmospheric deposition is an important iron source. Satellite images and data (such as PODLER, MODIS, MSIR) combined with back-trajectory analyses identified natural sources of iron–containing dust. Iron-bearing dusts erode from soil and are transported by wind. Although most dust sources are situated in the Northern Hemisphere, the largest dust sources are located in northern and southern Africa, North America, central Asia and Australia.

Heterogeneous chemical reactions in the atmosphere modify the speciation of iron in dust and may affect the bioavailability of deposited iron. The soluble form of iron is much higher in aerosols than in soil (~0.5%). Several photo-chemical interactions with dissolved organic acids increase iron solubility in aerosols. Among these, photochemical reduction of oxalate-bound Fe(III) from iron-containing minerals is important. The organic ligand forms a surface complex with the Fe (III) metal center of an iron-containing mineral (such as hematite or goethite). On exposure to solar radiation the complex is converted to an excited energy state in which the ligand, acting as bridge and an electron donor, supplies an electron to Fe(III) producing soluble Fe(II). Consistent with this, studies documented a distinct diel variation in the concentrations of Fe (II) and Fe(III) in which daytime Fe(II) concentrations exceed those of Fe(III).

Volcanic ash as an iron source 
Volcanic ash has a significant role in supplying the world's oceans with iron. Volcanic ash is composed of glass shards, pyrogenic minerals, lithic particles and other forms of ash that release nutrients at different rates depending on structure and the type of reaction caused by contact with water.

Increases of biogenic opal in the sediment record are associated with increased iron accumulation over the last million years.  In August 2008, an eruption in the Aleutian Islands deposited ash in the nutrient-limited Northeast Pacific. This ash and iron deposition resulted in one of the largest phytoplankton blooms observed in the subarctic.

Carbon sequestration

Previous instances of biological carbon sequestration triggered major climatic changes, lowering the temperature of the planet, such as the Azolla event.  Plankton that generate calcium or silicon carbonate skeletons, such as diatoms, coccolithophores and foraminifera, account for most direct sequestration. When these organisms die their carbonate skeletons sink relatively quickly and form a major component of the carbon-rich deep sea precipitation known as marine snow. Marine snow also includes fish fecal pellets and other organic detritus, and steadily falls thousands of meters below active plankton blooms.

Of the carbon-rich biomass generated by plankton blooms, half (or more) is generally consumed by grazing organisms (zooplankton, krill, small fish, etc.) but 20 to 30% sinks below  into the colder water strata below the thermocline. Much of this fixed carbon continues into the abyss, but a substantial percentage is redissolved and remineralized. At this depth, however, this carbon is now suspended in deep currents and effectively isolated from the atmosphere for centuries. (The surface to benthic cycling time for the ocean is approximately 4,000 years.)

Analysis and quantification
Evaluation of the biological effects and verification of the amount of carbon actually sequestered by any particular bloom involves a variety of measurements, combining ship-borne and remote sampling, submarine filtration traps, tracking buoy spectroscopy and satellite telemetry. Unpredictable ocean currents can remove experimental iron patches from the pelagic zone, invalidating the experiment.

The potential of fertilization to tackle global warming is illustrated by the following figures. If phytoplankton converted all the nitrate and phosphate present in the surface mixed layer across the entire Antarctic circumpolar current into organic carbon, the resulting carbon dioxide deficit could be compensated by uptake from the atmosphere amounting to about 0.8 to 1.4 gigatonnes of carbon per year. This quantity is comparable in magnitude to annual anthropogenic fossil fuels combustion of approximately 6 gigatonnes. The Antarctic circumpolar current region is one of several in which iron fertilization could be conducted—the Galapagos islands area another potentially suitable location.

Dimethyl sulfide and clouds

Some species of plankton produce dimethyl sulfide (DMS), a portion of which enters the atmosphere where it is oxidized by hydroxyl radicals (OH), atomic chlorine (Cl) and bromine monoxide (BrO) to form sulfate particles, and potentially increase cloud cover. This may increase the albedo of the planet and so cause cooling—this proposed mechanism is central to the CLAW hypothesis. This is one of the examples used by James Lovelock to illustrate his Gaia hypothesis.

During SOFeX, DMS concentrations increased by a factor of four inside the fertilized patch.  Widescale iron fertilization of the Southern Ocean could lead to significant sulfur-triggered cooling in addition to that due to the  uptake and that due to the ocean's albedo increase, however the amount of cooling by this particular effect is very uncertain.

Financial opportunities
Beginning with the Kyoto Protocol, several countries and the European Union established carbon offset markets which trade certified emission reduction credits (CERs) and other types of carbon credit instruments. In 2007 CERs sold for approximately €15–20/ton .  Iron fertilization is relatively inexpensive compared to scrubbing, direct injection and other industrial approaches, and can theoretically sequester for less than €5/ton , creating a substantial return. In August, 2010, Russia established a minimum price of €10/ton for offsets to reduce uncertainty for offset providers. Scientists have reported a 6–12% decline in global plankton production since 1980. A full-scale plankton restoration program could regenerate approximately 3–5 billion tons of sequestration capacity worth €50-100 billion in carbon offset value. However, a 2013 study indicates the cost versus benefits of iron fertilization puts it behind carbon capture and storage and carbon taxes.

Debate

While ocean iron fertilization could represent a potent means to slow global warming, there is a current debate surrounding the efficacy of this strategy and the potential adverse effects of this.

Precautionary principle

The precautionary principle is a proposed guideline regarding environmental conservation. According to an article published in 2021, the precautionary principle (PP) is a concept that states, "The PP means that when it is scientifically plausible that human activities may lead to morally unacceptable harm, actions shall be taken to avoid or diminish that harm: uncertainty should not be an excuse to delay action." Based on this principle, and because there is little data quantifying the effects of iron fertilization, it is the responsibility of leaders in this field to avoid the harmful effects of this procedure. This school of thought is one argument against using iron fertilization on a wide scale, at least until more data is available to analyze the repercussions of this.

Ecological issues

Critics are concerned that fertilization will create harmful algal blooms (HAB) as many toxic algae are often favored when iron is deposited into the marine ecosystem. A 2010 study of iron fertilization in an oceanic high-nitrate, low-chlorophyll environment, however, found that fertilized Pseudo-nitzschia diatom spp., which are generally nontoxic in the open ocean, began producing toxic levels of domoic acid. Even short-lived blooms containing such toxins could have detrimental effects on marine food webs. Most species of phytoplankton are harmless or beneficial, given that they constitute the base of the marine food chain. Fertilization increases phytoplankton only in the open oceans (far from shore) where iron deficiency is substantial. Most coastal waters are replete with iron and adding more has no useful effect. Further, it has been shown that there are often higher mineralization rates with iron fertilization, leading to a turn over in the plankton masses that are produced. This results in no beneficial effects and actually causes an increase in CO2.

Finally, a 2010 study showed that iron enrichment stimulates toxic diatom production in high-nitrate, low-chlorophyll areas which, the authors argue, raises "serious concerns over the net benefit and sustainability of large-scale iron fertilizations". Nitrogen released by cetaceans and iron chelate are a significant benefit to the marine food chain in addition to sequestering carbon for long periods of time.

Ocean acidification 
A 2009 study tested the potential of iron fertilization to reduce both atmospheric CO2 and ocean acidity using a global ocean carbon model. The study found that, "Our simulations show that ocean iron fertilization, even in the extreme scenario by depleting global surface macronutrient concentration to zero at all time, has a minor effect on mitigating CO2-induced acidification at the surface ocean." Unfortunately, the impact on ocean acidification would likely not change due to the low effects that iron fertilization has on CO2 levels.

History 
Hart returned to this issue in a 1942 paper entitled "Phytoplankton periodicity in Antarctic surface waters", but little other scientific discussion was recorded until the 1980s, when oceanographer John Martin of the Moss Landing Marine Laboratories renewed controversy on the topic with his marine water nutrient analyses. His studies supported Hart's hypothesis. These "desolate" regions came to be called "high-nutrient, low-chlorophyll regions" (HNLC).

John Gribbin was the first scientist to publicly suggest that climate change could be reduced by adding large amounts of soluble iron to the oceans. Martin's 1988 quip four months later at Woods Hole Oceanographic Institution, "Give me a half a tanker of iron and I will give you an ice age," drove a decade of research.

The findings suggested that iron deficiency was limiting ocean productivity and offered an approach to mitigating climate change as well. Perhaps the most dramatic support for Martin's hypothesis came with the 1991 eruption of Mount Pinatubo in the Philippines. Environmental scientist Andrew Watson analyzed global data from that eruption and calculated that it deposited approximately 40,000 tons of iron dust into oceans worldwide. This single fertilization event preceded an easily observed global decline in atmospheric  and a parallel pulsed increase in oxygen levels.

The parties to the London Dumping Convention adopted a non-binding resolution in 2008 on fertilization (labeled LC-LP.1(2008)). The resolution states that ocean fertilization activities, other than legitimate scientific research, "should be considered as contrary to the aims of the Convention and Protocol and do not currently qualify for any exemption from the definition of dumping". An Assessment Framework for Scientific Research Involving Ocean Fertilization, regulating the dumping of wastes at sea (labeled LC-LP.2(2010)) was adopted by the Contracting Parties to the Convention in October 2010 (LC 32/LP 5).

Multiple ocean labs, scientists and businesses have explored fertilization. Beginning in 1993, thirteen research teams completed ocean trials demonstrating that phytoplankton blooms can be stimulated by iron augmentation. Controversy remains over the effectiveness of atmospheric  sequestration and ecological effects. Ocean trials of ocean iron fertilization took place in 2009 in the South Atlantic by project LOHAFEX, and in July 2012 in the North Pacific off the coast of British Columbia, Canada, by the Haida Salmon Restoration Corporation (HSRC).

See also 
 Carbon dioxide sink
 Iron chelate
 Ocean pipes
 Liebig's law of the minimum
Iron cycle

References

Aquatic ecology
Planetary engineering
Climate engineering